The BRW Rich 200, 2014 is the 31st annual survey of the wealthiest people resident in Australia, published online by The Australian Financial Review on 26 June 2014. 

In the 2014 list, the net worth of the wealthiest individual, Gina Rinehart, was 14.02 billion. Fourteen women and 186 men made the 2014 list.

The BRW Rich Families List was published annually since 2008. In the 2014 list, the Smorgon family headed the list with estimated wealth of 2.77 billion. The Smorgon families headed the families list in every year of its publication. The families list was last published in 2015.

List of individuals 

{| class="wikitable"
!colspan="2"|Legend
|-
! Icon
! Description
|-
|
|Has not changed from the previous year's list
|-
|
|Has increased from the previous year's list
|-
|
|Has decreased from the previous year's list
|}

List of families

{| class="wikitable"
!colspan="2"|Legend
|-
! Icon
! Description
|-
|
|Has not changed from the previous year's list
|-
|
|Has increased from the previous year's list
|-
|
|Has decreased from the previous year's list
|}

See also
 Financial Review Rich List
 Forbes Asia list of Australians by net worth

References

External links 

2014 in Australia
2014